Trasporto Passeggeri Emilia-Romagna (TPER, Italian for Emilia-Romagna passenger transportation) is a public company overseeing public transportation in the Metropolitan City of Bologna, in the province of Ferrara and in parts of the provinces of Modena and Ravenna, Italy.

It owns part of Trenitalia Tper, which operates train services in the wider Emilia-Romagna region, on railway lines overseen by both Rete Ferroviaria Italiana and Ferrovie Emilia Romagna.

History 
The current company was born on 1 February 2012 from the merger of the transport division of ATC, which at that time operated public transportation services in the Bologna and Ferrara basins, with the transport division of Ferrovie Emilia Romagna (FER).

In the early months of 2014, the company became the reference shareholder of SETA, a company that provides local public transportation services by road in the provinces of Modena, Reggio Emilia and Piacenza.

As of December 2014, TPER holds shareholdings in 13 companies, mainly operating in the passenger and freight transport sector.

Company structure 
The share capital is divided as follows among the various public bodies of Emilia-Romagna and 3 provinces of Lombardia:
 Emilia-Romagna Region: 46.13%;
 Municipality of Bologna: 30.10%;
 Metropolitan City of Bologna: 18.78%;
 ACT Reggio Emilia: 3.60%;
 Province of Ferrara: 1.01%;
 Municipality of Ferrara: 0.65%;
 Province of Parma: 0.04%;
 Province of Reggio Emilia: 0.04%;
 Province of Modena: 0.04%;
 Ravenna Holding Spa: 0.04%;
 Province of Rimini: 0.04%;
 Province of Mantova: 0.0132%;
 Province of Lodi: 0.0132%;
 Metropolitan City of Milan: 0.0136%

Services 

 Urban bus lines in Bologna, Ferrara, Imola
 Suburban bus lines in the Metropolitan City of Bologna, province of Ferrara, province of Modena, province of Ravenna
 Parking management in Bologna and Imola
 Car sharing service Corrente in Bologna and Casalecchio di Reno
 Bike sharing service in Bologna and Imola

Current Fleet 

The bus fleet inherited from ATC consists of 1200 vehicles.

The fleet circulating in Bologna is composed of: Mercedes-Benz Citaro, Mercedes-Benz Cito, Mercedes-Benz Integro, Mercedes-Benz Sprinter, Iveco CityClass, Irisbus Citelis, Iveco Bus Urbanway, Iveco Bus Crossway, Irisbus Crealis Neo, Iveco Daily Way bus, BredaMenarinibus Monocar 240, BredaMenarinibus Zeus, BredaMenarinibus Vivacity, BredaMenarinibus Avancity, BredaMenarinibus Citymood, CAM BusOtto, CAM Alè, Setra S 419 UL, Volvo 7700, MAN Lion's City, Neoplan Centroliner, Van Hool A300, Solaris Trollino, Solaris Urbino.

Urban Fleet

Minibuses
2306-2310 Mercedes-Benz O413 Sprinter
2311-2316 Iveco  70C14 CNG Sitcar Cititour
2317-2323 Mercedes 516 CDI Sprinter Atlas Cityline (formerly of Kautra, Kaunas (LT))
2144-2416 BMB M 200 E ZEUS
9640-9643 Mercedes O416 CDI Sprinter
9644 Iveco 50C14 CNG

Buses and Midbuses
2503, 2505, 2506, 2509, 2514, and 2515 MAN T154 CAM Alè
2517, 2519 and 2522 MAN T154 CAM Alè (formerly 230 of Conerobus Ancona (2517); 51 and 52 of GTT (2519 and 2518 respectively); and 1233, 1243, and 1244 of SETA Modena (2520, 2521, and 2522 respectively))
2523-2533 Rampini Alè (2523 was a demonstrative vehicle of Rampini, while the number 2532 and 2533 were purchased from Trieste Trasporti)
2551-2555 BMB M231 CU CNG Vivacity
2610-2615 Mercedes-Benz O520 Cito 8.9 m
2616-2618 Mercedes-Benz O520 Cito 9.6 m
2619-2622 Mercedes-Benz O520 Cito 8 m
2623-2625 Mercedes-Benz O520 Cito 8.9 m
2629-2631 BMB M240 EN Altereco
2632-2639 BMB M240 EL Altereco
2640-2641 VanHool A330 Hybrid
2645-2649 and 2653 Mercedes-Benz O520 Cito 9.6 m (purchased from LINE Lodi and TEP Parma)
2654-2655 Mercedes-Benz O520 Cito 8.9 m (purchased from Dolomitibus)
2656-2667 MAN A37H Lion's City Hybrid
2911-2915 BredaMenarinibus BMB M230/1 MU
5324 and 5330 Iveco 491E.12.22 CityClass 4 doors
5333-5334, 5339-5341, 5343-5345, 5347-5353, 5355-5356, 5358, 5361-5363, 5365-5369, 5371-5373, 5375, 5377-5381 Iveco 491E.12.22 CityClass 3 doors
5502-5510 BMB M240 LU CNG 3 doors
5511-5531 Irisbus 491E.12.27 CNG CityClass
5532-5535 Irisbus 491E.12.24 CNG CityClass
5536-5545 BMB M240 LU CNG 3 doors
5546-5565 BMB M240 LU CNG 4 doors
5566-5575 Irisbus 491E.12.27 CNG CityClass
5576 BMB M240 NU CNG
5577-5598 BMB M240 LU CNG Avancity 4 doors
5599-5610 Irisbus Citelis 12 CNG
5611-5365 Menarini Bus 250 Citymood 12 CNG IIA
5636-5666 Menarini Bus 250 Citymood 12 LNG IIA
5667-5672 MAN Lion's City Hybrid CNG
5673-5691 Mercedes-Benz O530 NU Citaro Facelift 3 doors (purchased from Trieste Trasporti)
5692-5725 MAN Lion's City Hybrid CNG
5726-5735 Menarini Bus 250 Citymood 12 LNG IIA
9045 Mercedes-Benz O530 N Citaro 3 doors
9444-9449 Iveco 200E.9.15 Cacciamali EuroPolis
9450-9455 Iveco 200E.10.20 Cacciamali EuroPolis
9800-9806 Iveco 491E.10.24 CNG CityClass
9850-9855 Iveco 491E.12.24 CNG CityClass
9856-9867 Mercedes-Benz O530 N3 Citaro

Bendy Buses

6031-6035 Neoplan N4522/3 Centroliner (formerly of TL Lausanne (CH))
6036-6050 Mercedes-Benz O530G Citaro Facelift 4 doors (formerly of Trieste Trasporti)
6400-6408 Iveco Urbanway 18 Hybrid
6501-6509 and 6511-6514 BMB M340 U CNG
6515-6520 MAN A23 NG 313 CNG 
6521-6532 MAN A23 Lion's City CNG
6533-6553 Mercedes-Benz O530 G3 Citaro CNG
6554-6564 BMB M350S CNG Avancity Plus
6565-6578 MAN A40 Lion's City CNG 4 doors
6579-6584 MAN A40 Lion's City CNG 3 doors

Suburban and Interurban Fleet

Minibuses

826 Mercedes O413 Sprinter
830 Mercedes 518CDI Sprinter (formerly of the SACA Bus consortium (owned by Zuccarini))
831 Mercedes O515 U (formerly of the SACA BUS consortium (owned by Zuccarini))
832-834 Irisbus Daily A50/E4/20/B (formerly of SEAL La Spezia)
9600, 9605-9606, 9608-9611 Iveco A45.12 TurboDaily
9620 Iveco A50C13/L19
9621 Iveco A50/E4/21/B
9622-9624 Iveco A50C18

Buses

370, 373-375, 377, and 379 Iveco 393.12.35 MyWay
383-384, 386, and 388-393 Mercedes-Benz Integro
395-397, and 399-400 Irisbus SFR160 Arway 12
727-735 and 737 Mercedes O404.10 RHA
738-739, and 742 Iveco 100E21 Eurocargo Midi Cacciamali
743-744, 748-750, 752, and 755 Mercedes-Benz Tourino
756 Autosan Gemini (purchased in 2018)
1301-1307 and 1309-1318 Irisbus 399E.12.35 MyWay
1319-1323 Mercedes-Benz O550 LÜ
1324-1327, 1329-1347, and 1351-1356 Setra S 417 UL
1357-1359 Irisbus SFR141 Arway
1360-1366 MAN Lion's Regio 14
1367-1379 Mercedes-Benz O530 LÜ 3 axes
1401, 1410, 1416-1418, 1420-1429, 1431-1432, and 1434-1438 Mercedes-Benz O530 NÜ Citaro
1441, 1443, and 1445 Mercedes-Benz O530 NÜ 3 axes, 15 m
1446-1493 Iveco Bus Crossway LE
1501-1522, and 1530-1531 Mercedes-Benz O530 N1 Citaro
1532-1543 Mercedes-Benz O530 N2 Citaro
1544-1553 Mercedes-Benz O530 N3 Citaro 3 doors
1554-1568, and 1570-1572 Mercedes-Benz O530 N3 Citaro 2 doors
1573-1576 BMB M240 LU CNG Avancity+
1581-1587 BMB M240 LS CNG
1588-1590 Mercedes-Benz O550 Integro (formerly of Tide Buss, Bergen (NO))
1591-1620 Mercedes-Benz O530 N3 Citaro 2 doors
1621-1634 Mercedes-Benz O530 N3 CNG
1635-1642 MAN A21 Lion's City CNG
1643-1662 Menarini Bus 250 Citymood 12 IIA
1663-1664 and 1670 MAN A21 NL243 Lion's City CNG (formerly of Helsingin Bussiliikenne, Helsinki (FIN))
1665-1668 Mercedes Benz O530 NÜ Citaro Facelift (formerly of Kroiss, Rosenheim (DE) (1665-1667); and Stadtverkehr Friedrichshafen (DE) (1668))
1669 Mercedes-Benz Conecto LF (formerly a demonstration vehicle in Frankfurt (DE))
1671-1676 Mercedes-Benz O530 NÜ Citaro (formerly Stadtverkehr Konstanz (DE)
1677 Mercedes-Benz O530 NÜ Citaro Facelift (formerly of Stadtbus Chur (CH))
1678-1682 MAN A21 NL 313 Lion's City (formerly of STI Thun (CH))
1683-1686 MAN A21 NL 313 CNG 2 doors (formerly of TICE Esch-sur-Alzette (LUX))
1687-1688 Mercedes-Benz O530 K Citaro New (formerly of Nettbus Oslo (NO))
2700-2728 Mercedes-Benz O530 Citaro C2 Hybrid, 2 doors
3200-3214 Scania Interlink LNG
3215-3222 MAN Lion's Intercity
4200-4219 Iveco Bus Crossway 12 LE
8659 Cacciamali TCI Sigma 10 IN.47.24 (formerly of Ferrovie Emilia Romagna)
8812-8813 Irisbus 397E.12.35 Orlandi 2001 (formerly of Ferrovie Emilia Romagna)
8866 Iveco 680E.12.26 TurboCity-I (formerly of Ferrovie Emilia Romagna, and of Autoguidovie Italiane (2012-2013))
8903-8904 and 8916 Iveco 393E.12.35 MyWay (formerly of Ferrovie Emilia Romagna)
8920, 8929-8930, 8932, and 8940 Irisbus 399E.12.35 MyWay
9060-9072 Mercedes-Benz O530 N1 Citaro
9073-9074 Irisbus 591E.12.24 CNG CityClass 2 doors
9101-9105 and 9107-9109 Iveco 393E.12.35 MyWay
9250-9254 and 9256-9264 MAN A01 UL 313 Regional CAM I.2000.12 
9307-9310, 9312, and 9314-9328 Irisbus 399E.12.35 MyWay
9514 Mercedes-Benz O550 N Integro
9515 MAN SU 313
9516-9519 Irisbus 389E.12.35 EuroClass

Bendy Buses

901-902 VanHool AG300S
926-927 and 929-937 VanHool AG300S
938-947 Mercedes Benz O530 GN Citaro 4 doors
948-968 Volvo B9LA CNG Säffle (formerly of Keolis Stockholm (SE))
969 Volvo B7LA (formerly of Autopostale (CH))
970-973 Mercedes-Benz O530 GN Citaro 3 doors (formerly of SWM Münster (DE) (970-971); SWH Heilbronn (DE) (972); and AAGL Liestal (CH) (973))
974-990 Iveco Urbanway 18 3 doors
991-993 Mercedes-Benz O530 GN Citaro Facelift CNG 3 doors (purchased from abroad, yet to enter service)
1801-1825 Mercedes-Benz O530 GNU Citaro
1826-1828 Mercedes-Benz O530 GNU Citaro Facelift
1829-1831 Mercedes-Benz O530 GNU Citaro (formerly of VHH Hamburg (DE))
1832-1835 Menarini Bus 360 Citymood 18 IIA
8997 Solaris Urbino 18 (formerly of Ferrovie Emilia Romagna)
9051 VanHool AG300S
9054-9056 Mercedes-Benz O530 GN Citaro

Trolleybuses

1021-1023 and 1025-1040 MAN NGT 204F CAM Busotto (nicknamed Bologna 1 series)
1041-1055 MAN NGT 204F ABB CAM Busotto (nicknamed Bologna 2 series)
1056-1066 Solaris Trollino 18
1101-1149 Irisbus Crealis Neo 18 (nicknamed "Emilio" by a group of primary schoolchildren who won the naming competition for this bus, promoted by TPER).

Deposits 
TPER oversees three bus deposits in Bologna (Battindarno depot, Due Madonne depot and Ferrarese depot), one in Imola (BO), one in Prati di Castel di Casio (BO) (upper Reno valley), one in Ferrara (Trenti deposit) and one in Comacchio (FE). Moreover, several proprietary car parks are scattered in the area managed by the company, along the main suburban and extra-urban lines.

TPER has also inherited three railway deposits from FER: Bologna Roveri, Ferrara Porta Reno (now closed) and Rimini Clementini, which then was ceded to START Romagna together with its bus services. The Rimini Clementini depot was soon after turned into a car park

Rolling Stock

Electric Trainsets 

These are now part of the Trenitalia-Tper service basin.

001-002 ALe 088 FIREMA trainsets
001-002 Le 088 FIREMA semi-pilot coaches 
001 Le 096 FIREMA coach
ALe 054 trainsets (4 trainsets, 2 formerly of the Ferrovia Bologna-Vignola, 2 formerly of SNCB)
ALe 228 trainsets (formerly of SNCB and ACTM Modena)
001-004 ALe 122 Ansaldo/Casaralta
001-012 and 101-114 ETR350 Stadler Rail/Ansaldo
001 and 006 ETR 243 ALFA 2 TFA Titagarh FIREMA Adler (on loan from EAV Naples)

Electric Locomotives 
E.464.901-906 and E.464.890-893  (ABB Bombardier)

Carriages 
Corifer Vivalto semi-pilot coaches, and regular coaches

Diesel Trainsets 
013-018 Fiat Ferroviaria ALn 668 (formerly of Ferrovia Ferrara-Suzzara and Ferrovie Emilia Romagna)
019-021 Fiat Ferroviaria ALn 663 (formerly of Ferrovia Ferrara-Suzzara and Ferrovie Emilia Romagna)
026-037 ATRIBO ATR 220 (built by Pojazdy Szynowe Pesa Bydgoszcz)
067-082 Fiat Ferroviaria ALn 067-082 (formerly of ACT Reggio Emilia)
101 and 103-105 Fiat Ferroviaria ALn 663 (formerly of Ferrovia Bologna-Portomaggiore and Ferrovie Emilia Romagna)
601-602 Fiat Ferroviaria ALn 668 (formerly of Ferrovia Suzzara-Parma)
611-613 Fiat Ferroviaria ALn 668 (formerly of Ferrovia Suzzara-Parma)
903 Fiat Ferroviaria ALn 663 (formerly of Ferrovia Suzzara-Parma and Ferrovie Emilia Romagna)
1008-1009 Fiat Ferroviaria ALn 668 (formerly of Ferrovie Padane and Ferrovie Emilia Romagna)
1010-1013 Fiat Ferroviaria ALn 668 (formerly of Ferrovie Padane and Ferrovie Emilia Romagna)
1014-1015 Fiat Ferroviaria ALn 668 (formerly of Ferrovie Padane and Ferrovie Emilia Romagna)
1016-1021 Fiat Ferroviaria ALn 663 (formerly of Ferrovie Padane and Ferrovie Emilia Romagna)
2463-2466 Fiat Ferroviaria ALn 668 (formerly of ACT Reggio Emilia)

Pilot Carriages for Diesel Trainsets 

031-038 Fiat Ferroviaria Ln 880 (formerly of Ferrovia Ferrara-Suzzara and Ferrovie Emilia Romagna)
306-313 Fiat Ferroviaria Ln 880 (formerly of Ferrovie Padane and Ferrovie Emilia Romagna)
371 Fiat Ferroviaria Ln 880 (formerly of Ferrovia Suzzara-Parma and Ferrovie Emilia Romagna)
377 Fiat Ferroviaria Ln 778 (formerly of Ferrovia Suzzara-Parma and Ferrovie Emilia Romagna)
401-404 Fiat Ferroviaria Ln 778 (formerly of Ferrovia Bologna-Portomaggiore and Ferrovie Emilia Romagna)

Former Fleet 

These vehicles have been withdrawn by TPER from service due to various reasons.

Urban Minibuses

2213 Fiat A 49.10 TurboDaily CAM Pollicino 35p (withdrawn in 2012, it was the only surviving bus of the 2201-2213 series, since the others were withdrawn by ATC)
2214-2218 Fiat A 49.10.1 TurboDaily CAM Pollicino 35p (withdrawn in 2012)
2403, 2406, and 2408 Iveco 291E.7.11 CAM DownTown (withdrawn in 2012, these buses were the only surviving ones of the 2401-2410 series, with the others having been withdrawn by ATC)

Urban Buses and Midbuses

2501-2502, 2504, 2507, 2509-2513, and 2516 MAN T154 CAM Alè (2513 was withdrawn in 2013 due to a fire, while the rest were stopped between 2018-2020)
2518, 2521, and 2522 (2518 has been withdrawn in 2015 due to a fire, while 2521 and 2522 have been stopped in 2020)
2601-2609, 2626-2628, 2642-2643 MAN T154 CAM Hybrid (withdrawn in 2017)
2644 Mercedes-Benz O520 Cito 9.6 m (ceded to a private operator)
2901-2910 BMB M230/1 U (withdrawn between 2016 and 2019)
2916-2921 Cacciamali TCM890 (withdrawn between 2016 and 2019)
5201-5246 Iveco 480.12.21 Turbocity-U (numbers 5227, 5229, 5230, 5236, and 5245 withdrawn in 2004 by ATC, the rest were completely withdrawn in the following years, with 5203 withdrawn in 2017. Originally preserved by Associazione Milanese Bus Storici, 5203 was however demolished, like the rest of the buses in this series]]
5301-5310 MAN NL 202 F CAM Busotto
5247-5267 Iveco 490.12.22 Turbocity-UR (withdrawn between 2016 and 2018)
5311-5320 BMB M221/1 LU (withdrawn between 2012 and 2018)
5321-5323, 5325-5329, and 5331 Iveco 491E.12.22 CityClass 4 doors (withdrawn between 2013 and 2020)
5332, 5335-5338, 5342, 5346, 5354, 5357, 5359-5360, 5664, 5370, and 5376 Iveco 491E.12.22 CityClass 3 doors
(5342, 5360, and 5364 were withdrawn for a fire in 2013, 2015 and 2017)
(the rest were withdrawn between 2017 and 2020)
5501 (withdrawn due to a fire in 2016)
9044 MAN NU 263-5 (withdrawn in 2017)
9430-9439 and 9443 Iveco 200E.9.15 Cacciamali EuroPolis (9430-9436 and 9439 demolished, 9437 ceded to the Ferrara Fire Department)
9456 Cacciamali TCC 760 CAU (demolished)
9457 Irisbus 203E.9.27 CNG EuroPolis
9709-9712 Iveco 200EEY.7 EuroPolis (withdrawn)
9713-9716 EPT Horus (withdrawn in 2015, but stopped before then due to a lack of spare parts, it is unknown what happened to them after 2015)

Urban Bendy Buses 

6001-6016 Iveco 490.18.29 TurboCity-UR (withdrawn in 2018 from TPER, the vehicles 6002, 6012, and 6016 were sold to SETA Modena, where they are still active and were re-numbered from 225 to 227)
6017-6028 BMB M321/1 U (all withdrawn between 2012 and 2019 and since then demolished)
6029-6030 Neoplan N4421 Centroliner (formerly of Chur (CH) they were withdrawn in 2019 and demolished in 2020)
6510 BMB M340 U CNG (withdrawn due to a fire)

Suburban and Interurban Buses

Minibuses 

60 Iveco A45.10.1 (withdrawn)
801-820 Iveco 59E12 Carvin
No. 804 was sold to Giacomo Tours in Vallo della Lucania in 2014
No. 806, 807, 813, and 820 were sold to CO.E.R.BUS joint-venture in Imola in 2014, respectively to Canè (807 and 820), Europa Bus (806), and Santerno Bus (813) in 2014. Today they have been withdrawn from these companies too. 
No. 808 and 819 were sold to Ricci Bus in 2014.
The rest were withdrawn
821-825 and 827-829 Mercedes-Benz O413 Sprinter (all sold)
823 was sold to Canè (as part of CO.E.R.BUS) in Imola in 2014
The others were also sold to other private operators under the SACA BUS and COSEPURI ventures. 
9601-9604, 9607, and 9612-9615 Iveco TurboDaily A50C13L19 (either withdrawn or sold)
9616-9618 Iveco TurboDaily A45.10 (withdrawn)
9619 Iveco TurboDaily A45.12/P (withdrawn)

Buses 

52, 62, and 64 Setra S228 DT (withdrawn)
53, 61, 63, and 65-66 Setra S210 H (withdrawn)
54-56 and 58 Setra S211 HD (withdrawn)
57 Setra S216 HDS (withdrawn)
59 Setra S210 HD (withdrawn)
67 Setra S211 H (withdrawn)
349-353 Iveco 370S.12.30 CAM I80 (349, 350 and 351 withdrawn, 352 and 353 sold to an unspecified private operator)
354-363 Iveco 370S.12.30 (all withdrawn, 354 was sold to Gino Tour, a member of CO.E.R.BUS in 2014, recently withdrawn)
364-369 MAN A01 UL 313 Regional CAM I.2000.12
365 and 366 were sold to Ricci Bus, a member of CO.E.R.BUS, in 2014 and renumbered 2441 and 2442 respectively
368 was sold to Società Servizi Trasporti Ferrara in 2014
364 and 367 were sold to unspecified operators
369 was sold to COSEPURI and recently withdrawn
371, 372, 376, 380 381, and 382 Iveco 393.12.35 MyWay 
371 was sold to COSEPURI in 2014
372 was sold to Società Servizi Trasporti Ferrara
376, 378 and 380 were all sold to Autoguidovie Italiane
381 and 382 were both ceded to Santerno Bus, a member of CO.E.R.BUS, in 2014
385, 387, and 394 Mercedes-Benz Integro 
385 was sold to Ricci Bus, a member of CO.E.R.BUS in 2014, and renumbered 2237
387 was sold to SACA Bus in 2014
394 was sold to Zaganelli e Ravaglia, a member of CO.E.R.BUS., of Lugo di Romagna in 2014, and renumbered 2250
398 Irisbus RF260 Arway (withdrawn in 2012 due to a fire)
432-440, 472, 474, 478, 482-484 Iveco 671.12.24 Effeuno (withdrawn)
432 was sold to Zaganelli e Ravaglia, a member of CO.E.R.BUS of Lugo di Romagna, renumbered 2251 and recently was demolished
440 was sold to Pollini of Conselice, a member of CO.E.R.BUS, renumbered 2251 and recently demolished
443-471 Menarini M201/2 SLI (withdrawn)
443 and 462 were sold to Pollini of Conselice, a member of CO.E.R.BUS, renumbered 2231 and 2232, and recently demolished. 
448 and 450 were sold to Ricci Bus, a member of CO.E.R.BUS, renumbered 2238 and 2239, and recently demolished
471 was sold to COSEPURI
486-500 Menarini M201/2 SLI (withdrawn)
498 sold to Ricci Bus, a member of CO.E.R.BUS, renumbered 2240 and demolished recently
655-675 BMB M220 LS (withdrawn, those vehicles which have been sold are no longer fit for service)
665 was withdrawn back in 1996 due to an arson attack
655, 659-660, and 662 were sold to SACA Bus in 2014
656 and 664 were sold to Ricci Bus, a member of COSEPURI, in 2014 
661 was sold to Flybus Cortina Express, a member of COSEPURI, in 2014
676-685 and 687-696 Mercedes-Benz O405 N2 (withdrawn)
678 and 680 were withdrawn
676, 678-680, 683-684, and 689 were sold to COSEPURI
685 was sold to SACA Bus
677 and 696 were sold to SEAL La Spezia and renumbered 1677 and 1696
697-700 MAN NL262 FS CAM Busotto (withdrawn in November 2020 following the withdrawal of route BLQ)
701-702 MAN NL263 FS CAM Busotto New (withdrawn in November 2020 following the withdrawal of route BLQ)
736 Mercedes-Benz O404.10 RHA (sold to ATAM Reggio Calabria)
740-741, 743-754 Mercedes O510 Tourino
740 and 741 Iveco 100E.21 Eurocargo Midi Cacciamali (sold to COSEPURI)
743 and 744 were sold to Società Servizi Trasporti in 2014
745-747 and 753 were sold to SACA Bus
751 and 754 were sold to ATAM Reggio Calabria and renumbered 413 and 414
853 Iveco 315.8.17 (demolished)
1308 Irisbus 399E.12.35 MyWay (sold to Zaganelli e Ravaglia, a member of CO.E.R.BUS, in Lugo)
1328, 1348-1350 Setra S417 UL
1328 was sold to Gamberini of Ravenna
1348-1350 were sold to COSEPURI
1402-1403, 1407-1409, 1411, 1413-1415, 1419, 1430, 1433, and 1439-1440 Mercedes-Benz O530 NÜ Citaro
1402 and 1403 were sold to SEAL La Spezia in 2014
1408, 1409, 1410, 1419, and 1433 have been sold to Ricci Bus, a member of COSEPURI, in 2014
1411 was sold to B&B of Savigno, a member of COSEPURI
1413 and 1414 have been withdrawn due to a fire
1430 has been sold to Canè of Imola, a member of CO.E.R.BUS, and renumbered 2228
1439 and 1440 have been sold to Santerno Bus, a member of CO.E.R.BUS, and renumbered 2229 and 2230
1404-1406 MAN NL283 CAM Busotto New
1404 was sold to Gino Tour, a member of COSEPURI, in 2014
1405 was withdrawn
1406 was sold to Ricci Bus, a member of COSEPURI, in 2014
1442 and 1444 Mercedes-Benz O530 NÜ Citaro 3 axes
1442 was sold to Ricci Bus, a member of COSEPURI, in 2014
1444 was withdrawn in 2018 due to an arson attack which destroyed it in Castelfranco Emilia
1523-1529 Mercedes-Benz O530 N1 Citaro
1523-1525 were sold to SACA Bus in 2014
1526-1529, originally sold to SACA Bus in 2014, were sold later on to SEAL La Spezia
1569 Mercedes-Benz O530 N3 Citaro (withdrawn due to a fire)
8601-8606 Iveco 380E.12.35 Euroclass (demolished)
8656-8657 Cacciamali TCI 9.72 (sold to START Romagna in 2012)
8658 and 8660 Cacciamali TCI Sigma 10 IN47.24 (sold to START Romagna in 2012)
8722-8731 Iveco 370.12.L25
8723, 8725, and 8728 withdrawn by TPER
8722, 8724, 8726-8727, 8729-8731 were sold to START Romagna in 2012, and withdrawn later on
8732-8733 Iveco 370.12.30 Dallavia (sold to START Romagna in 2012)
8735-8738 Iveco 370.12.30
8735 withdrawn by TPER
8736-8738 sold to START Romagna in 2012 and withdrawn later on
8739-8740 Iveco 370S.12.30 (all withdrawn)
8751-8753 Iveco 370.12.25
8751 and 8752 were withdrawn
8753 was sold to START Romagna in 2012
8754 Mercedes-Benz O303 Garbarini (withdrawn)
8755 Setra S210 H (withdrawn)
8804 Fiat 370S.12.35H Orlandi Domino GT (withdrawn)
8811 Irisbus 397E.12.35 Orlandi (sold to START Romagna in 2012 and renumbered 35114, for the START Away hiring services)
8854 Iveco 671.12.24 I-Effeuno (withdrawn)
8855-8861 Menarini M201/2 SLI (withdrawn between 2012 and 2017)
8862-8866 and 8867 Iveco 680E.12.26 TurboCity-I (withdrawn between 2013 and 2020)
8901-8902 Iveco 391E.12.29 Eurorider Dallavia (originally sold to Autoguidovie in 2012, they returned to TPER in 2016)
8901 was withdrawn by TPER
8902 was sold to Pollini of Conselice, a member of CO.E.R.BUS
8905-8915 Ivveco 393E.12.35 MyWay
8909, 8910, and 8911 were sold to Società Servizi Trasporti Ferrara, but were originally sold to Autoguidovie in 2012
8907, 8908, 8912, and 8913 were sold to Autoguidovie in 2012
8905 and 8906 were sold to START Romagna in 2012
8918, 8922-8928, 8931, and 8933-8939 Irisbus 399E.12.35 MyWay
8918 was sold to a private operator
8926, 8927, 8931, 8933, 8936, 8938 and 8939 were sold to Autoguidovie in 2012 and renumbered respectively 1821, 1822, 1823, 1824, 1825, 1826, and 1827
8922, 8923, 8924, 8925, 8928, 8934, 8935, and 8937 were sold to START Romagna in 2012
9004-9009 Iveco 380E.12.35 Euroclass (demolished in 2020)
9012-9013 MAN A01 NU 313 (withdrawn)
9014 MAN 18.460 HCL Beulas Eurostar (sold to Societa Servizi Trasporti Ferrara in 2014, it was demolished in 2019)
9015 Iveco 380E.12.38 Orlandi TopClass HD (demolished)
9016 and 9020 MAN A13 RH403 (withdrawn)
9021-9024 MAN NL222 FS CAM (withdrawn in 2019)
9100 and 9106 Iveco 393E.12.35 MyWay (9100 withdrawn due to a fire in 2012, 9106 dismissed)
9176-9177 and 9190-9195 Iveco 370.12.30 Dallavia (withdrawn between 2012 and 2018)
9180-9188 Iveco 370S.12.30 CAM (withdrawn between 2012 and 2018)
9196-9197 Iveco 370SE.12.35 Dallavia (withdrawn between 2019 and 2020)
9203, 9210 and 9213-9214 Menarini M201/2 SLI (9203 never entered service with TPER, while 9210 and 9213 and 9214 were withdrawn between 2014 and 2017)
9215 and 9219 MAN NU 313 (withdrawn)
9217 MAN UL 292 (withdrawn)
9218 MAN UL 310 (withdrawn)
9220 Mercedes-Benz O407 (withdrawn)
9221-9222 MAN UL 312 (withdrawn and demolished in 2019)
9223 and 9236 MAN NL 202
9223 was withdrawn
9236 ceded to the Ferrara fire department for exercising purposes in 2014
9224 Iveco 591E.12.27 CityClass (withdrawn in 2019, demolished in 2020)
9230 and 9233 MAN UEL 292 (withdrawn)
9238 Setra S300 NC (withdrawn)
9255 MAN A01 UL 313 CAM Regional I2000.12 (withdrawn)
9311, 9313 and 9317 Irisbus 399E.12.35 MyWay (all withdrawn due to separate fires)
9500-9513 Iveco 380E.12.29 Euroclass (all demolished)
9520 Iveco 389E.12.35 EuroClass

Bendy Buses 

903 VanHool AG300S (withdrawn in 2020)
918-925 VanHool AG300S (withdrawn between 2018 and 2020)
928 VanHool AG300S (withdrawn in 2020)
9050 VanHool AG300S (withdrawn in 2020)
904-917 BMB M321/1S 
906 was sold to SETA Modena in 2014, renumbered 2801 and withdrawn in 2018
911 and 916 were sold to SETA Piacenza in 2012 and renumbered 490 and 491.They were withdrawn in 2019
904-905, 907-910, 912-915, and 917 were all withdrawn and demolished in 2019)
9052-9053 MAN NG 272 (all withdrawn)

Trolleybuses 

As the Bredabus 4001.12 FLU of the latter ATC (fleet number series 011-020) never entered service into TPER, the following vehicles, which merged in TPER, have been dismissed:

002-010 Menarini M220 FLU (withdrawn between 2012 and 2014)
1024 MAN NGT 204F CAM Busotto "Bologna 1" (withdrawn in 2020)

Preserved Buses 

8866 Iveco 680E.12.26 TurboCity-I - Preserved by Inbus Club Emilia-Romagna in 2021.

Historical Collection

TPER's predecessor, Azienda Trasporti Consorziali, has established over the years a collection of various train carriages; railway and tramway steam engines; electric tramcars; buses and trolleybuses which over the past 133 years had guaranteed public transport in the Bologna area. The museum, called "Collezione Storica ATC", was established inside the former tram and bus shed "Deposito Zucca" in Via di Saliceto; very close to the Ustica Memorial Museum, which hosts the wreck of the MC-Donnel Douglas DC-9 operating the Itavia Flight 870, which crashed in the Tyrrhenian Sea between the isles of Ponza and Ustica, killing all the people aboard. The Collezione Storica ATC has the following vehicles in its inventory:

Tramway and Railway Vehicles

Buses and Trolleybuses

Bus Routes Bologna Basin

Bologna Urban Routes 

A Poliambulatorio Rizzoli-Piazza Maggiore-Piazza Liber Paradisus (Does not Operate on Sundays and Public Holidays)
C Via Castiglione-Piazza Maggiore-Stazione Centrale-Parcheggio Tanari (Weekdays Only)
D Stazione Centrale-Via Ravone (Does not Operate on Sundays and Public Holidays)
T1 Piazza di Porta Ravegnana-Ospedale Malpighi (Saturdays, Sundays and Public Holidays)
T2 Piazza Maggiore-Piazza Roosevelt-Stazione Centrale-Parcheggio Tanari (Saturdays Only)
11A Via Corelli/Ponticella-Via Indipendenza-Agucchi Bertalia
11B Ponticella-Via Indipendenza-ITC Rosa Luxembourg (Does not Operate on Sundays and Public Holidays)
11C Via Corelli/Ponticella-Via Indipendenza-Arcoveggio Giardini
13 Via Normandia-Via Rizzoli-San Ruffillo-Via Pavese (Weekdays Only)
13A Via Normandia-Via Rizzoli-San Ruffillo-Rastignano (Weekdays Only)
13A Via Normandia-Via Rizzoli-San Ruffillo-Rastignano-Carteria di Sesto (Weekdays Evenings Only)
13 Carteria di Sesto-Rastignano/Via Pavese-Piazza Malpighi-Lavino di Mezzo (Weekdays Evenings Only)
13A Piazza Cavour-San Ruffillo-Rastignano (Saturdays, Sundays and Public Holidays, evening trips to Carteria di Sesto, the last trip terminates in Pianoro Vecchio)
13/ Via Pavese-San Ruffillo-Piazza Cavour (Saturdays, Sundays and Public Holidays)
13/ Via Normandia-Via Lame (Saturdays, Sundays and Public Holidays)
13 Via Lame-Lavino di Mezzo (Saturdays, Sundays and Public Evenings Only)
14 Deposito Due Madonne/Zona Roveri/Pilastro-Ospedale Sant'Orsola-Via Rizzoli-Stadio-Piazza Giovanni XXIII
14A Piazza Giovanni XXIII-Stadio-Via Rizzoli-Ospedale Sant'Orsola-Deposito Due Madonne
14B Piazza Giovanni XXIII-Stadio-Via Rizzoli-Ospedale Sant'Orsola-Zona Roveri (Weekdays Only)
14C Piazza Giovanni XXIII-Stadio-Via Rizzoli-Ospedale Sant'Orsola-Pilastro
15 XX Settembre Autostazione-Via Rizzoli-San Lazzaro di Savena Via Pertini (Weekdays Only)
16 Piazza Cavour-Villa Mazzacorati-Via Foscherara-Piazzale Atleti Azzurri d'Italia
18 Piazza Roosevelt-Via Zanardi-Noce (Weekdays Only)
18 Piazza San Francesco-Via Zanardi-Noce (Saturdays, Sundays and Public Holidays)
18A Piazza San Francesco-Via Zanardi-Noce-Trebbo di Reno (Sundays Only)
19 Casteldebole-Ospedale Maggiore-Via Rizzoli-San Lazzaro di Savena Via Pertini
19A Casteldebole-Ospedale Maggiore-Via Rizzoli-San Lazzaro di Savena-Idice-Ozzano dell'Emilia-Tolara Bivio
19B Casteldebole-Ospedale Maggiore-Via Rizzoli-San Lazzaro di Savena-San Camillo
19C Casteldebole-Ospedale Maggiore-Via Rizzoli-San Lazzaro di Savena Stazione Ferroviaria (SFM)
20 Pilastro-Via San Donato-Via Rizzoli-Casalecchio di Reno
20A Pilastro-Via San Donato-Via Rizzoli-Casalecchio di Reno Stazione Garibaldi (SFM)
20B Pilastro-Via San Donato-Via Rizzoli-Casalecchio di Reno-San Biagio
21 Filanda-Via Marconi-Stazione Centrale-Via Andreini
21B Filanda-Via Marconi-Stazione Centrale-San Sisto Ostello (Evenings Only)
25 Deposito Due Madonne-Ospedale Sant'Orsola-Via Rizzoli-Stazione Centrale-Dozza Via del Gomito
25A Deposito Due Madonne-Ospedale Sant'Orsola-Via Rizzoli-Stazione Centrale-Dozza
27A Piazzale Atleti Azzurri d'Italia/Via Genova-Via Rizzoli-Via Indipendenza-Corticella Via Byron
27B Piazzale Atleti Azzurri d'Italia-Via Rizzoli-Via Indipendenza-Corticella Stazione Ferroviaria (SFM)
27C Piazzale Atleti Azzurri d'Italia/Via Genova-Via Rizzoli-Via Indipendenza-Via Tuscolano (Weekdays Only)
28 Via Indipendenza-Via Marconi-Via dei Mille-Fiera (Weekdays Only)
28 Piazza dei Martiri-Via dei Mille-Fiera (Saturdays, Sundays and Public Holidays)
29 Parcheggio Tanari-Via Rizzoli-Piazza Maggiore-Via di Roncrio
29S Via di Roncrio-Piazza Maggiore-Via Zanardi-Noce
30 San Michele in Bosco-Piazza Malpighi-Via Marconi-Stazione Centrale-Via Colombo Sostegno (Does not Operate on Sundays and Public Holidays)
30/ San Michele in Bosco-Piazza Malpighi-Via Marconi-Stazione Centrale (Sundays Only)
32 Stazione Centrale-Porta San Mamolo-Stazione Centrale (Right Circular, does not operate on Sundays and Public Holidays)
33 Stazione Centrale-Porta San Mamolo-Stazione Centrale (Left Circular)
34 Piazza dell'Unità-Ospedale Maggiore (Does not operate on Saturday afternoon, Sundays and Public Holidays)
35 Ospedale Maggiore-Stazione Centrale-Fiera-Pilastro-CAAB (Does not operate on Sundays and Public Holidays)
35/ Ospedale Maggiore-Stazione Centrale (Saturday afternoon and Sundays Only) 
36 Ospedale Bellaria-Ospedale Sant'Orsola-Stazione Centrale-Ospedale Maggiore-Via Naldi
37 Rotonda CNR-Stazione Centrale-Ospedale Sant'Orsola-Via Bombicci (Weekdays Only)
37 Stazione Centrale-Ospedale Sant'Orsola-Via Bombicci (Saturdays and Sundays Only)
38 Fiera-Via Farini-Via XXI Aprile-Certosa-Ospedale Maggiore-Stazione Centrale-Fiera (Right Periferic Circular)
39 Fiera-Stazione Centrale-Ospedale Maggiore-Via XXI Aprile-Via Farini-Fiera (Left Periferic Circular)
51 Largo Lercaro-San Ruffillo-Monte Donato (Does not Operate on Sundays and Public Holidays)
51 Piazza Cavour-Monte Donato (Sundays Only)
52 Piazza Cavour-Villa Aldini-Sabbiuno
52A Piazza Cavour-Villa Aldini
54 Aeroporto-Borgo Panigale-Villaggio Speranza (Does not Operate on Sundays and Public Holidays)
55 San Ruffillo Stazione Ferroviaria (SFM)-Villa Mazzacorati-Deposito Due Madonne-Pilastro-CAAB (Does not Operate on Sundays and Public Holidays)
56 Via Larga-Zona Roveri (Weekdays Only)
58 Villa Spada-Santuario di San Luca
59 Piazza Cavour-Villa Guastavillani (Does not Operate on Sundays and Public Holidays)
60 Ospedale Sant'Orsola-Mercato San Donato-Ospedale Sant'Orsola
61 Deposito Battindarno-Stadio-Piazza Malpighi-Via Marconi-Stazione Centrale-Via Massarenti-Villa Mazzacorati-Stazione Centrale-Ospedale Maggiore-Deposito Battindarno (Night Bus)
62 Deposito Due Madonne-Via Farini-Piazza Malpighi-Via Marconi-Stazione Centrale-Corticella-Stazione Centrale-Via Rizzoli-Deposito Due Madonne (Night Bus)
68 Via dei Mille-Via Stalingrado-Camping Città di Bologna
79 Casalecchio di Reno-Zona Industriale Zola Predosa-Borgo Panigale-Piazza Giovanni XXIII (Weekdays Only)
80 Borgo Panigale Via Normandia-Zona Industriale Zola Predosa (Weekdays Only)
85 Casalecchio di Reno AUSL-Casalecchio di Reno-Casalecchio di Reno Stazione Garibaldi-Unipol Arena (SFM) (Does not Operate on Sundays and Public Holidays)
940 Stazione Centrale-Aeroporto (sostitutivo notturno people mover)
944 Ospedale Maggiore-Santa Viola-Pontelungo-Via Triumvirato-Aeroporto

Other urban special bus lines of Bologna (from Friday to Sunday, eve of holidays and public holidays only)

N1 Funo Stazione-Mille-San Lazzaro
N2 Dozza-Mille
N3 Ponte Ronca-Mille-San Sisto
N4 Piazza Giovanni XXIII-Mille-Roveri
N5 Bertalia-Mille-Battaglia
N6 Normandia-Rastignano

Imola Urban Routes 

1 Ospedale Nuovo-Zolino-Stazione Ferroviaria (SFM and National Railways)-Porta dei Servi (Does not Operate on Sundays and Public Holidays)
2 Pedagna-Ospedale Nuovo-Zolino-Stazione Ferroviaria (SFM and National Railways)-Campanella-Rivazza-Stazione Ferroviaria (SFM and National Railways) (Does not Operate on Sundays and Public Holidays)
4 Via Grieco Poste-Stazione Ferroviaria (SFM and National Railways)-Via Dalla Chiesa (Does not Operate on Sundays and Public Holidays)
9 Stazione Ferroviaria (SFM and National Railways)-Pedagna Ovest (Sundays Only)
104 Via Grieco Poste-Stazione Ferroviaria (SFM and National Railways)-Via Dalla Chiesa-Castel del Rio
140 Imola Autostazione-Montecatone-Montebello (Does not Operate on Sundays and Public Holidays)
150 Imola Autostazione-San Prospero (Does not Operate on Sundays and Public Holidays)
160 Imola Autostazione-Zello (Does not Operate on Sundays and Public Holidays)

Bologna Suburban Routes 

81 Bologna Stazione Centrale (SFM, National and International Railways)-Ospedale Maggiore-Longara
81A Bologna Stazione Centrale (SFM, National and International Railways)-Ospedale Maggiore-Longara-Padulle-Bagno di Piano (Does not operate on Sundays and Public Holidays)
83 Bologna Via Lame-Ospedale Maggiore-Casalecchio di Reno-Riale-Calderino di Monte San Pietro-Zona Industriale Bacchello (Does not operate on Sundays and Public Holidays)
86 Piazza Roosevelt-Ospedale Maggiore-Casalecchio di Reno-Marullina (Weekdays Only)
86 Piazza San Francesco-Ospedale Maggiore-Casalecchio di Reno-Marullina (Saturdays, Sundays and Public Holidays)
87 Rotonda CNR/Stazione Centrale/Via Lame-Ospedale Maggiore-Borgo Panigale-Anzola Emilia-Ponte Samoggia-Castelfranco Emilia Stazione Ferroviaria (SFM, National Railways and SETA bus services)
88 Via dei Mille-Cadriano-Granarolo dell'Emilia
88C Via dei Mille-Z.I.Cadriano-Cadriano-Granarolo dell'Emilia (Weekdays Only)
89 Ca' dell'Orbo/Villanova di Castenaso-Ospedale Sant'Orsola-Via dei Mille-Via Marconi-Certosa-Casalecchio di Reno-San Biagio (Does not operate on Sundays and Public Holidays)
89C San Biagio-Casalecchio di Reno-Certosa-Via Marconi-Ospedale Sant'Orsola-Villanova di Castenaso-Ca' dell'Orbo (Does not operate on Sundays and Public Holidays)
90 Piazza Cavour-Ospedale Bellaria-San Lazzaro di Savena-Cicogna-San Camillo
90A Piazza Cavour-Ospedale Bellaria-San Lazzaro di Savena-Cicogna-Idice-Ozzano dell'Emilia Via Galvani (Does not operate on Sundays and Public Holidays)
90C Piazza Cavour-Ospedale Bellaria-San Lazzaro di Savena-Cicogna-Idice-Ozzano dell'Emilia Facoltà di Veterinaria (Does not operate on Sundays and Public Holidays)
90/ San Lazzaro di Savena-Ospedale Bellaria-Piazza Malpighi-Via Marconi-Via dei Mille (Does not operate on Sundays and Public Holidays)
91 Bologna Stazione Centrale (SFM, National and International Railways)-Ospedale Maggiore-Calderara di Reno
91A Bologna Stazione Centrale (SFM, National and International Railways)-Ospedale Maggiore-Calderara di Reno-Padulle
92 Sibano/Marzabotto/Sasso Marconi Terminal-Borgonuovo-Casalecchio di Reno-Ospedale Maggiore-Via dei Mille-Noce-Trebbo di Reno (Does not operate on Sundays and Public Holidays)
92A Trebbo di Reno-Noce-Via dei Mille-Ospedale Maggiore-Casalecchio di Reno-Borgonuovo-Sasso Marconi Terminal (Does not operate on Sundays and Public Holidays)
92B Trebbo di Reno-Noce-Via dei Mille-Ospedale Maggiore-Casalecchio di Reno-Borgonuovo-Sasso Marconi Terminal/Marzabotto/Sibano (Does not operate on Sundays and Public Holidays)
93 Piazza dei Martiri-Via San Donato-San Sisto-Granarolo dell'Emilia-Baricella-Mondonuovo Deposito
93A Piazza dei Martiri-Via San Donato-San Sisto-Granarolo dell'Emilia (Does not operate on Sundays and Public Holidays)
93B Piazza dei Martiri-Via San Donato-San Sisto-Granarolo dell'Emilia-Baricella (Does not operate on Sundays and Public Holidays)
94 Bazzano Stazione Ferroviaria (SFM and SETA bus services)-Crespellano-Zola Predosa-Riale-Casalecchio di Reno-Piazza Malpighi-Via Marconi-Via dei Mille-Ospedale Sant'Orsola-San Lazzaro di Savena-Idice-Ozzano dell'Emilia-Osteria Grande-Castel San Pietro Terme (Does not operate on Sundays and Public Holidays)
95 Pontelungo/Via Marconi-Corticella-Funo/Centergross-Interporto/Saletto (Weekdays Only)
96 Piazza Cavour-San Ruffillo-Rastignano-Carteria di Sesto-Musiano-Pian di Macina-Pianoro Nuovo-Pianoro Vecchio
96 Piazza Cavour-San Ruffillo-Rastignano-Musiano-Pian di Macina-Pianoro Nuovo-Pianoro Vecchio-Loiano-Monghidoro (Sundays Only)
96A Piazza Cavour-San Ruffillo-Rastignano-Carteria di Sesto (Does not operate on Sundays and Public Holidays)
96/ Pianoro Vecchio-Pianoro Nuovo-Pian di Macina-Musiano-Carteria di Sesto-Rastignano-San Ruffillo-Piazza Malpighi-Via Marconi-Via dei Mille-Corticella-Centergross-Interporto (Weekdays Only)
97 Bologna Via Lame-Via dei Mille-Corticella-Castel Maggiore-Funo-Argelato-Castello d'Argile-San Giorgio di Piano
97A Bologna Via Lame-Via dei Mille-Corticella-Castel Maggiore-Funo-Argelato-Castello d'Argile-San Giorgio di Piano-San Pietro in Casale (Does not operate on Sundays and Public Holidays)
97B Bologna Via Lame-Via dei Mille-Corticella-Castel Maggiore-Funo-Argelato-Castello d'Argile-San Giorgio di Piano-San Pietro in Casale-Galliera/San Venanzio/Poggio Renatico (Does not operate on Sundays and Public Holidays)
97C Bologna Via Lame-Via dei Mille-Corticella-Castel Maggiore-Funo-Argelato-Castello d'Argile-Pieve di Cento-Cento Autostazione
98 Bologna Via Lame-Via dei Mille-Corticella-Castel Maggiore
98A Bologna Via Lame-Via dei Mille-Corticella-La Pira-Castel Maggiore (Does not operate on Sundays and Public Holidays)
99 Piazza dei Martiri-Ospedale Sant'Orsola-Villanova di Castenaso-Ca' dell'Orbo-Castenaso-Medicina (Autoguidovie Italiane's Bus Services)
99A Piazza dei Martiri-Ospedale Sant'Orsola-Villanova di Castenaso-Ca' dell'Orbo-Castenaso-Medicina-Sesto Imolese-Massa Lombarda-Lugo Autostazione (Start Romagna Bus Services)
99B Piazza dei Martiri-Ospedale Sant'Orsola-Villanova di Castenaso-Ca' dell'Orbo-Castenaso-Budrio-Medicina
99C Piazza dei Martiri-Ospedale Sant'Orsola-Villanova di Castenaso-Ca' dell'Orbo-Castenaso-Medicina-Castelguelfo

Interurban Routes

Routes Serving Bologna 

101 Bologna Autostazione-San Lazzaro di Savena-Idice-Ozzano dell'Emilia-Osteria Grande-Castel San Pietro Terme-Toscanella di Dozza-Imola Autostazione (Cooperativa Trasporti Riolo Terme Bus Services)
106 Bologna Autostazione-San Lazzaro di Savena-Zona Industriale Ponte Rizzoli (Weekdays Only)
991 (119) Bologna-Mirabilandia-Lido di Classe-Lido di Savio-Milano Marittima-Cervia-Pinarella-Tagliata-Cesenatico-Gatteo Mare (Summer Seasonal Route, Start Romagna and SAC Cervia bus services)
200 Medicina-Villanova di Castenaso-Ospedale Sant'Orsola-Bologna Autostazione (Weekdays Only)
205 Bologna Autostazione-Ospedale Sant'Orsola-Villanova di Castenaso-Castenaso-Ponte Rizzoli-Castelguelfo (Does not operate on Sundays and Public Holidays)
206 Bologna Autostazione-Sesto Imolese-Massalombarda-Lugo (Does not operate on Sundays and Public Holidays) (Start Romagna bus services)
211 Bologna Autostazione-Ospedale Sant'Orsola-Villanova di Castenaso-Castenaso-Budrio-Medicina-Castelguelfo (Does not operate on Sundays and Public Holidays)
237 Bologna Autostazione-Ospedale Sant'Orsola-Villanova di Castenaso-Ca' dell'Orbo-Dugliolo-Alberino (Does not operate on Sundays and Public Holidays)
242 Piazza dei Martiri-Ospedale Sant'Orsola-Villanova di Castenaso-Castenaso-Budrio-Molinella-Medicina (Night Bus, Saturdays Only)
243 Bologna Autostazione-Ospedale Sant'Orsola-Villanova di Castenaso-Castenaso-Budrio-Molinella-Marmorta (Does not operate on Sundays and Public Holidays)
257 Bologna Autostazione-Ospedale Sant'Orsola-Villanova di Castenaso-Ca' dell'Orbo-Castenaso-Villa Fontana-Sant'Antonio-Campotto-Argenta (Does not operate on Sundays and Public Holidays)
273 Bologna Autostazione-Ospedale Sant'Orsola-Villanova di Castenaso-Budrio-Molinella-Santa Maria Codifiume/Ospital Monacale (Does not operate on Sundays and Public Holidays)
353 Menarini-Cadriano-Altedo-Malalbergo-Gallo-Ferrara Corso Isonzo (Weekdays Only)
354 Bologna Autostazione-Altedo-Gallo (Does not operate on Sundays and Public Holidays)
356 Bologna Autostazione-Dozza-Altedo-Malalbergo-Gallo-Ferrara Autostazione
357 Bologna Autostazione-Dozza-Altedo-Mondonuovo-Alberino-Passo Segni (Does not operate on Sundays and Public Holidays)
446 Bologna Autostazione-Dozza-Bentivoglio-Saletto (Does not operate on Sundays and Public Holidays)
447 Bologna Autostazione-Zona Industriale Saliceto-Bentivoglio-Saletto (Does not operate on Sundays and Public Holidays)
448 Bologna Autostazione-Corticella-Centergross-Interporto (Weekdays Only)
450 Cento Autostazione-Pieve di Cento-Castello d'Argile-Argelato-Corticella-Via dei Mille-Bologna Via Lame (Weekdays Only, Direct Route)
556 Cento Autostazione-Decima-San Giovanni in Persiceto-Bargellino-Borgo Panigale-Ospedale Maggiore-Bologna Autostazione (Does not operate on Sundays and Public Holidays)
576 Bologna Autostazione-Ospedale Maggiore-Borgo Panigale-Bargellino-San Giovanni in Persiceto-Sant'Agata Bolognese-Crevalcore (Does not operate on Sundays and Public Holidays)
646 Bologna Autostazione-Ospedale Maggiore-Borgo Panigale-Anzola Emilia-Ponte Samoggia-Calcara-Piumazzo-San Cesario-Spilamberto-Bazzano Stazione (SFM and SETA Bus Services)(Does not operate on Sundays and Public Holidays)
651 Bologna Autostazione-Ospedale Maggiore-Borgo Panigale-Ponte Samoggia-Calcara-Bazzano Stazione/Zocca/Savigno/Tolè (Does not operate on Sundays and Public Holidays)
671 Bologna Autostazione-Casalecchio di Reno-Riale-Zola Predosa-Crespellano-Bazzano Stazione-Vignola Terminal (SFM and SETA Bus Services)
672 Bologna Autostazione/Casalecchio di Reno-Zona Industriale Zola Predosa-Lavino di Sopra/Bazzano Stazione-Vignola Terminal (SFM and SETA Bus Services) (Does not operate on Sundays and Public Holidays)
673 Via Normandia-Zola Predosa Rigosa-Pilastrino di Zola (Weekdays Only)
676 Porta Sant'Isaia-Via Lunga-Philip Morris (Weekdays Only)
677 Bologna Stazione Centrale-Via Normandia-Anzola dell'Emilia-Philip Morris (Weekdays Only)
686 Bologna Autostazione-Casalecchio di Reno-Riale-Calderino di Monte San Pietro-Tolè
706 Bologna Autostazione-Casalecchio di Reno-Borgonuovo-Sasso Marconi-Marzabotto-Sibano-Pian di Venola-Vergato (Does not operate on Sundays and Public Holidays)
826 Bologna Autostazione-Casalecchio di Reno-Sasso Marconi-Vado-Rioveggio-San Benedetto Val di Sambro-Castiglione dei Pepoli-Roncobilaccio-San Giacomo
856 Bologna Autostazione-Casalecchio di Reno-Sasso Marconi-Vado-Rioveggio-San Benedetto Val di Sambro
900 Bologna Autostazione-Rastignano-Carteria di Sesto-Pianoro Vecchio-Loiano-Monghidoro (Weekdays Only, Direct Route)
906 Bologna Autostazione-Rastignano-Carteria di Sesto-Pian di Macina-Pianoro Vecchio-Livergnano-Loiano-Monghidoro-Castel dell'Alpi
916 Bologna Autostazione-San Lazzaro di Savena-Idice-Monterenzio-Quinzano-Frassineta-Monghidoro
918 Bologna Autostazione-San Lazzaro di Savena-Idice-Quinzano-Loiano

Interurban Routes not serving Bologna 

103 Castel San Pietro Terme-Sassoleone-Piancaldoli
110 Castel San Pietro Terme Stazione Ferroviaria-Montecalderaro
111 Varignana-Osteria Grande
112 Castel San Pietro Terme Stazione Ferroviaria-Castel San Pietro Terme
113 Castel San Pietro Terme Stazione Ferroviaria-Scania-Castel San Pietro Terme
121 San Lazzaro di Savena-Mirandola
122 San Lazzaro di Savena-Villanova di Castenaso-Ca' dell'Orbo
124 Ponticella-Ospedale Bellaria-San Lazzaro di Savena
125 Ponticella-Villaggio Martino-San Lazzaro di Savena
126 San Lazzaro di Savena-Lago dei Castori
131 Ozzano Galvani/Facolta' di Veterinaria-Ozzano FS (CityBus Ozzano - introduced in 2021)
132 Ponte Rizzoli-Ozzano dell'Emilia (CityBus Ozzano 2021)
151 Imola Autostazione-Mordano-Bagnara di Romagna-Massalombarda-Lugo
231 Mondonuovo Deposito-Baricella-Granarolo dell'Emilia-Budrio
244 Budrio-Mezzolara-Molinella
247 Alberino-Medicina-Villafontana-Castel San Pietro Terme
248 Castel San Pietro Terme-Medicina
256 Medicina-Longastrino-Conselice
296 Conselice-Lugo-Bagnacavallo-Ravenna/Lido Adriano (this beach is served only in summer)
355 Altedo-Boschi
411 Argelato-Trebbo di Reno-Corticella Via Byron-Castel Maggiore
413 Castel Maggiore-Zona Industriale Saliceto
443 Funo-Zona Industriale Ca' de Fabbri
453 San Giorgio di Piano-Venezzano-Castello d'Argile-Cento Autostazione
455 San Pietro in Casale-Cento Autostazione
456 San Pietro in Casale-Poggetto-Cento Autostazione
505 Calderara di Reno-Longara-Bonconvento-Padulle-Bagno di Piano
531 San Giovanni in Persiceto-Castelfranco Emilia
656 Bazzano Stazione Ferroviaria-Monteveglio-Zocca
657 Bazzano Stazione Ferroviaria-Monteveglio-Castelletto di Serravalle-Savigno
658 Bazzano Stazione Ferroviaria-Monteveglio-Savigno-Goccia-Tolè
687 Sasso Marconi Terminal-Mongardino-Ponte Rivabella
688 Ponte Rivabella-Padernella
716 Marzabotto-Tolè
726 Vergato-Labante-Montese
727 Vergato-Cereglio-Montese
728 Vergato-Tolè
737 Vergato-Marano-Montese
746 Vergato-Riola-Porretta Terme
747 Porretta Terme-Marano-Montese
756 Porretta Terme-Abetaia-Montese
757 Porretta Terme-Querciola-Montese
766 Porretta Terme-Ponte della Venturina
767 Porretta Terme-Case Calistri
768 Porretta Terme-Casa Forlai
770 Porretta Terme Via Repubblica-Porretta Terme Terminal
776 Porretta Terme-Vidiciatico-Corno alle Scale
787 Porretta Terme-Pennola
796 Porretta Terme-Castel di Casio-Suviana-Baigno-Castiglione dei Pepoli
797 Porretta Terme-Ponte della Venturina-Badi-Suviana
798 Porretta Terme-Casola-Lizzo-Castel di Casio
806 Vergato-Badi-Suviana
808 Vergato-Riola-Castiglione dei Pepoli
827 Sasso Marconi Stazione Ferroviaria-Monzuno-Vado
828 San Benedetto Val di Sambro Stazione Ferroviaria-Castiglione dei Pepoli
829 Vergato-Stanco
846 Ponte Locatello-Grizzana-Vergato
857 Bivio Ca' di Martino-San Benedetto Val di Sambro-Monghidoro-Loiano
858 Bivio Ca' di Martino-Pian del Voglio-Bruscoli-Castiglione dei Pepoli
907 Monghidoro-Loiano Bivio Monzuno

School Routes

Bologna Urban and Interurban 

101 Bologna Autostazione-San Lazzaro di Savena-Idice-Ozzano dell'Emilia-Osteria Grande-Castel San Pietro Terme-Imola Istituto Alberghetti-Imola Guicciardini
123 Via Firenze-Ponticella
179 Via Normandia-Borgo Panigale-Rotonda Malaguti ITIS
180 ITC Manfredi Tanari-Istituto Aldini
181 Via Marconi/Bologna Autostazione-Istituto Serpieri
182 Piazza dell'Unità-ITC Manfredi Tanari
183 ITC Rosa Luxembourg-Ospedale Maggiore-Rotonda Malaguti ITIS
184 Bologna Autostazione-ITC Rosa Luxembourg
185 Piazza dei Martiri-ITC Rosa Luxembourg
186 Bologna Autostazione-Ospedale Sant'Orsola-Via Marchetti
187 Stazione Centrale-Ospedale Sant'Orsola-Via Marchetti
189 Case Nuove-Fiera
213 Bologna Autostazione-Via San Donato-Castenaso-Budrio-Fiesso-Vigorso-Medicina
300 Mondonuovo Deposito-Baricella-Minerbio-Granarolo dell'Emilia-Via San Donato-Via dei Mille-Piazza dei Martiri (Direct Route)
504 Sala Bolognese-Padulle-Funo-Castel Maggiore-Corticella-Bologna Autostazione
684 Bologna Autostazione-Casalecchio di Reno-Riale-Calderino di Monte San Pietro-Savigno
850 Bologna Autostazione-Casalecchio di Reno-A1 Motorway-Castiglione dei Pepoli-San Benedetto Val di Sambro-Pian del Voglio-Castel dell'Alpi (Direct Route)
903 Pianoro Vecchio-Pianoro Nuovo-Pian di Macina-Musiano-Carteria di Sesto-Rastignano-San Ruffillo-Villa Mazzacorati-Via Foscherara-San Lazzaro di Savena Istituto Majorana
904 Pianoro Vecchio-Pianoro Nuovo-Pian di Macina-Musiano-Carteria di Sesto-Rastignano-San Ruffillo-Villa Mazzacorati-Via Dagnini-Liceo Scientifico Enrico Fermi
905 Pianoro Vecchio-Pianoro Nuovo-Pian di Macina-Musiano-Carteria di Sesto-Rastignano-San Ruffillo-Villa Mazzacorati-Via Foscherara-ITC Manfredi Tanari

Imola Urban and Interurban 

101 Bologna Autostazione-San Lazzaro di Savena-Idice-Ozzano dell'Emilia-Osteria Grande-Castel San Pietro Terme-Imola Istituto Alberghetti-Imola Guicciardini
141 Imola Autostazione-Borgo Tossignano-Casalfiumanese-Castel del Rio
142 Imola Autostazione-Borgo Tossignano-Fontanelice-Sassoleone-Piancaldoli
143 Castel del Rio-Sassoleone-Piancaldoli
144 Imola Autostazione-Borgo Tossignano-Casalfiumanese
152 Imola Autostazione-Fruges-Massalombarda-Lugo
154 Imola Autostazione-Fruges-Massalombarda-Conselice-Campotto
156 Imola Autostazione-Castelguelfo
157 Imola Ospedale Nuovo-Castelguelfo-Medicina
160 Imola Autostazione-Zello
161 Imola Autostazione-Istituto Agrario Scarabelli
162 Imola Autostazione-Istituto Alberghetti
163 Imola Autostazione-Istituto Alberghetti-Guicciardini
164 Via Mascagni-Pedagna Ovest-Istituto Alberghetti-Guicciardini
165 San Benedetto-Istituto Alberghetti-Imola Autostazione-Pasquala

Interurban School Routes 

114 Ponte Quaderna-Castel San Pietro Terme Scuole
116 Medicina-Castel San Pietro Terme 
145 Castel del Rio-Firenzuola
231 Mondonuovo Deposito-Baricella-Granarolo dell'Emilia-Budrio
247 Imola Autostazione-Castel San Pietro Terme-Villafontana
358 Molinella-Alberino-Mondonuovo-Baricella-Altedo
442 San Marino di Bentivoglio-Bentivoglio-Castel Maggiore
444 Castel Maggiore-Granarolo dell'Emilia
506 Bonconvento-San Giovanni in Persiceto
507 Osteria Nuova Stazione Ferroviaria-San Giovanni in Persiceto
654 Savigno-Monteveglio-Bazzano-Vignola
689 Ponte Rivabella-Loghetti
851 Rioveggio-A1 Motorway-Casalecchio di Reno (Direct Route)

Prontobus Routes 

Prontobus routes are some bus routes which require reservation at least 24h before for some, most or all of their services:

Whilst not being considered a Prontobus per se, Route 54 has also some services to the Bologna Airport Hotel and the parkings which require a reservation 24h before
147 Toscanella di Dozza-Dozza Imolese
431 Molinella-Boschi-Baricella-Minerbio-Ospedale di Bentivoglio
432 Malalbergo-Altedo-Saletto-Ospedale di Bentivoglio
433 Galliera-San Pietro in Casale-San Giorgio di Piano-Ospedale di Bentivoglio
434 San Pietro in Casale-Altedo-Malalbergo
435 Pieve di Cento-Castello d'Argile-Argelato-San Giorgio di Piano-Ospedale di Bentivoglio
436 Castel Maggiore-Funo-Ospedale di Bentivoglio
437 Castenaso-Granarolo dell'Emilia-Ospedale di Bentivoglio
533 Anzola dell'Emilia-Le Budrie-San Giovanni in Persiceto
536 Caselle-Palata Pepoli-San Giovanni in Persiceto-Ospedale di San Giovanni in Persiceto
537 Bevilacqua-Galeazza-Palata Pepoli-Caselle-Bolognina-Crevalcore-San Giovanni in Persiceto
538 San Giovanni in Persiceto-Sant'Agata Bolognese-Nonantola

Former Routes of the Bologna Basin

Urban 

BLQ Stazione Centrale-Ospedale Maggiore-Aeroporto (replaced in November 2020 by the Marconi Express and by route 944)
14N Mille-Muratore (night bus)
17 Piazza Roosevelt-Sostegno (replaced by route 30 in 2012)
20C Pilastro-Rotonda Malaguti ITIS 
20N Mille-Facolta' di Agraria-San Sisto (night bus)
25N Mille-Dozza-Gomito (night bus)

Interurban 

136 Imola-Zona Industriale Ponte Quaderna (withdrawn in September 2021, replaced by routes 131 and 132)
659 Goccia-Savigno-Castelletto di Serravalle-Monteveglio-Bazzano-Crespellano-Calcara-Ponte Samoggia FS (withdrawn between 2019 and 2020)
825 Grizzana Stazione Ferroviaria-San Benedetto Val di Sambro-Brasimone Enea

Bus Routes Ferrara Basin

Ferrara Urban Routes 

1 Stazione FS-Frutteti
1C Stazione FS-Frutteti-Centro Commerciale Le Mura
2 Viale Olanda-Kennedy-Stazione FS-Barco
3 Palestro-Corso Porta Reno-Rivana-Barlaam-Stazione FS
4 Barlaam-Rivana-Corso Porta Reno-Montebello-Stazione FS
6 Ospedale di Cona-Stazione FS-Porotto
6C Ospedale di Cona-Cona-Stazione FS-Porotto
6/ Ospedale di Cona/Cona-Stazione FS
7 Via Trenti-Malborghetto
7F Via Trenti-Malborghetto-Francolino
9 Stazione FS-Eligio Mari-Pontegradella
9B Stazione FS-Eligio Mari-Pontegradella-Boara
9/ Stazione FS-Eligio Mari
11A Santa Maria Maddalena-Chiesuol del Fosso
11B Vallelunga-Bologna ex Dazio
15 Stazione FS-Fiera di Ferrara
21 Giovecca-Cavour-Kennedy-Stazione FS
323 Quartesana-Codrea-Cona-Alfonso d'Este-Aguscello
347 Kennedy-San Bartolomeo in Bosco
397 Vallelunga-Stazione FS-Bologna ex Dazio

Ferrara School Routes 

13 Via Pioppa-Via Cavour
13 Via Pavone-Via Pioppa
348 Kennedy-Spinazzino
390 Via Leopardi/Piazzale Dante-Stazione FS/Darsena Provvisoria/Rampari San Rocco
391 Autostazioni/Stazione FS-Polo Scolastico Via Canapa
392 Autostazioni/Stazione FS-Polo Scolastico ITI
393 Via Darsena/Stazione FS-Polo Scolastico Via Barlaam
394 Via Darsena/Stazione FS-Istituto Navarra
395 Servizio Scuola Media Bonati/Servizio Scuola San Luca
396 Borgo Fondo Reno-Porotto-Giovecca

Ferrara Interurban Routes

Interurban Routes Serving Ferrara 

310 Ferrara-Francolino-Ro-Alberone-Copparo
311 Ferrara-Boara-Ro-Alberone-Copparo
312 Ferrara-Boara-Copparo-Ariano-Goro
314 Ferrara-Pontegradella-Saletta-Copparo-Ariano-Goro
320 Ferrara-Formignana-Tresigallo-Ambrogio
321 Ferrara-Fossalta-Parasacco
322 Ferrara-Tresigallo-Jolanda-Ariano-Codigoro
326 Ferrara-Massafiscaglia-Lagosanto-Vaccolino
330/331 Ferrara-Ostellato-Comacchio-Porto Garibaldi-Lido degli Estensi-Lido di Spina-Lido delle Nazioni
340 Ferrara-Cona-Quartesana-Masi San Giacomo
342 Ferrara-Voghiera-Portomaggiore
344 Ferrara-San Nicolò-Argenta-Longastrino-Anita
345 Ferrara-San Nicolò-Molinella-Santa Maria Codifiume
346 Alberino-Codifiume-Passo Segni-Ferrara
354 Bologna-Altedo-Gallo
356 Bologna-Dozza-Altedo-Malalbergo-Gallo-Ferrara
360/361/370 Ferrara-Poggio Renatico-Cento-Casumaro-Finale Emilia
371/372/373 (San Martino Spino)-Malcantone-Bondeno-Ferrara / Bondeno-Stellata-Ficarolo-Salara
374 Ferrara-Ravalle-Bondeno-San Martino Spino
375 Ferrara-Diamantina-Bondeno-San Martino Spino
449 Ferrara-Bentivoglio
550 Ferrara-Mirabello-Cento

Interurban Routes not serving Ferrara 

315 Copparo-Ambrogio-Jolanda
316 Massafiscaglia-Tresigallo-Copparo-Cesta
319 Copparo-Massafiscaglia-Lidi Ferraresi (Summer Seasonal Route)
328 Tresigallo-Rovereto-Ostellato-Portomaggiore
332 Codigoro-Comacchio-Lido delle Nazioni-Porto Garibaldi-Ravenna
333 Codigoro-Comacchio-Porto Garibaldi-Ravenna
334 Lido delle Nazioni-Porto Garibaldi-Ravenna
335 Codigoro-Gorino
336 Lido di Volano-Abbazia di Pomposa-Codigoro–Ariano
337 Codigoro-Lido di Volano
338 Longastrino-Alfonsine-Mezzano-Lido degli Estensi Centro Scolastico
339 Gorino-Bosco della Mesola-Mesola-Ariano-Adria
363 Bondeno-Scortichino-Finale Emilia
364 Bondeno-Mirabello-Finale Emilia-Cento-Bologna
366 Bondeno-Quatrina-Finale Emilia-Pilastrello-Cento
551 Cento-Crevalcore-Modena
552 Cento-San Giovanni in Persiceto-Modena

Notes and references 

Transport companies of Italy
Transport in Bologna
Public transport in Italy
Metropolitan City of Bologna
Companies based in Bologna
Transport companies established in 2012
2012 establishments in Italy